Nicholas Thomas Nerich (November 13, 1893 – February 7, 1957) was an American competition swimmer who represented the United States at the 1912 Summer Olympics.

Biography
Nerich was born in New York City, and swam for the New York Athletic Club in Amateur Athletic Union (AAU) competition.  At the 1912 Olympics in Stockholm, Sweden, he competed in the semifinals of the men's 400-meter freestyle, as well as in the quarter-finals of the men's 100-meter freestyle.

He died in Astoria, Queens on February 7, 1957, and was buried at Mount Saint Mary Cemetery in Flushing.

References

External links
  Nicholas Nerich – Olympic athlete profile at Sports-Reference.com

1893 births
1957 deaths
American male freestyle swimmers
Olympic swimmers of the United States
Sportspeople from New York City
Swimmers at the 1912 Summer Olympics